I'm Diggin' It is the only studio album by the American country music singer Alecia Elliott. It was released in 2000 by MCA Nashville. It peaked at No. 18 on the Billboard Top Country Albums chart. The album includes the singles "I'm Diggin' It" and "You Wanna What?"

Twenty years passed before Elliott released her second album, Voodoo.

Production
The album was produced by Tony Brown and Jeff Teague. Elliott cowrote two of the album's songs.

Critical reception
Country Standard Time wrote that "Elliott's a talented vocalist, but what she's chosen (or been given) to sing is perfectly forgettable and nearly free of country influence." Nashville Scene thought that "'I’m Diggin’ It' and the ridiculous 'You Wanna What?' position Elliott as the silly, superficial younger sister of Shania Twain." Time opined that "Elliott's warm voice brings out the melody in every track, deepening and personalizing her songs."

Track listing
"Some People Fall, Some People Fly" (Matraca Berg, Randy Scruggs) – 3:00
"I Don't Understand" (Stephanie Bentley, Adrienne Follesé, Keith Follesé) – 3:17
"I'm Waiting for You" (Gary Baker, Alecia Elliott, Frank J. Myers) – 4:07
"Ain't No Ordinary Love" (Tommy Lee James, Robin Lerner) – 3:48
"Every Heart" (Michele McCord, Mark D. Sanders, Sharon Vaughn) – 3:40
"I'm Diggin' It" (Daryl Burgess, McCord) – 2:39
"That's the Only Way" (Cathy Majeski, Sunny Russ, Stephony Smith) – 3:22
"Say You Will" (Hunter Davis, Hillary Lindsey) – 3:38
"You Wanna What?" (Andy Bohatiuk, Elliott, Bill Terry) – 2:54
"Stay Awhile" (Mark Selby, Tia Sillers) – 2:57
"Some Say I'm Running" (Brent Bourgeois, Michael W. Smith) – 4:15

Personnel
Alecia Elliott: Vocal
Thomas Flora, Tareva Henderson, Jennifer O'Brien, John Wesley Ryles, Harry Stinson: Vocal Backing
Steuart Smith, Randy Scruggs, Jerry McPherson, Brent Mason: Guitars
Steve Gibson, George Marinelli: Guitars, Mandolin
Dan Dugmore: Guitars, Pedal Steel
Larry Franklin: Fiddle
Matt Rollings: Keyboards, Piano
Steve Nathan: Keyboards, Organ, Piano
Michael Rhodes: Bass
Eddie Bayers, Paul Leim, Greg Morrow: Drums
Tom Roady, Jeff Teague: Percussion

Chart performance

References

2000 debut albums
Alecia Elliott albums
MCA Records albums
Albums produced by Tony Brown (record producer)